Sihung Lung (c. 1930 – May 2, 2002), also known as Paul Lung, was a Taiwanese movie and TV actor of Manchu descent. He appeared in over 100 films and TV series throughout his career and was best known for playing paternal roles in films such as Eat Drink Man Woman and The Wedding Banquet. He frequently collaborated with award-winning director Ang Lee.

Life and career 
Lung enlisted in Chiang Kai-shek's army as a teenager to fight the Chinese Communist Party. After the Communists seized control of mainland China, he escaped to Taiwan, where he was selected to join an army-sponsored acting troupe. Acting later became his career. His experience playing an array of roles for the army troupe later led his being cast in over 100 Chinese-language films and in Taiwanese soap operas, typically playing criminals or tough guys.

Lung had already retired from films when Ang Lee began casting for his first full-length film, 1992's Pushing Hands, and the director, who recalled watching Mr. Lung as a child, asked him to play a father in the film. Lung's sensitive portrayal of an elderly man faced with change turned him into an international star and he became famous for playing fathers struggling with modernity and adult children in the movies known to some fans as the "Father Knows Best" trilogy.

Death 
By the time he appeared as "Sir Te", guardian of a mystical sword in Crouching Tiger, Hidden Dragon, Lung's health had deteriorated due to diabetes. He died of liver failure in 2002 at the age of 72.

Filmography

See also

Manchu people in Taiwan

References

External links

1930 births
2002 deaths
20th-century Taiwanese male actors
21st-century Taiwanese male actors
Chinese anti-communists
Chinese defectors
Chinese refugees
Deaths from diabetes
Deaths from liver failure
Male actors from Jiangsu
Military personnel of the Republic of China
People from Suqian
Male soap opera actors
Manchu male actors
Taiwanese male film actors
Taiwanese people of Manchu descent
Taiwanese male television actors
Taiwanese people from Jiangsu
Chinese male film actors
Chinese male television actors
20th-century Chinese male actors
21st-century Chinese male actors